Unified threat management (UTM) is an approach to information security where a single hardware or software installation provides multiple security functions. This contrasts with the traditional method of having point solutions for each security function. UTM simplifies information-security management by providing a single management and reporting point for the security administrator rather than managing multiple products from different vendors. UTM appliances have been gaining popularity since 2009, partly because the all-in-one approach simplifies installation, configuration and maintenance. Such a setup saves time, money and people when compared to the management of multiple security systems. Instead of having several single-function appliances, all needing individual familiarity, attention and support, network administrators can centrally administer their security defenses from one computer. Some of the prominent UTM brands are Cisco, Fortinet, Sophos, Netgear, FortiGate, Huawei, WiJungle, SonicWall and Check Point. UTMs are now typically called next-generation firewalls.

Features

UTMs at the minimum should have some converged security features like 
 Network firewall
 Intrusion detection service (IDS)

Intrusion prevention service (IPS)

Some of the other features commonly found in UTMs are:

 Gateway anti-virus
 Application layer (Layer 7) firewall and control 
 Deep packet inspection
 Web proxy and content filtering
Email filtering for spam and phishing attacks
 Data loss prevention (DLP)
 Security information and event management (SIEM)
 Virtual private network (VPN)
Network access control
 Network tarpit
Additional security services against Denial of Services (DoS), Distributed Denial of service (DDoS), Zero day, Spyware protection

Disadvantages

Although an UTM offers ease of management from a single device, it also introduces a single point of failure within the IT infrastructure. Additionally, the approach of a UTM may go against one of the basic information assurance / security approaches of defense in depth, as a UTM would replace multiple security products, and compromise at the UTM layer will break the entire defense-in-depth approach.

References

Computer network security
Computer security procedures